Sinistrin is a naturally occurring sugar polymer or polysaccharide, also known as polyfructosane. It belongs to the fructan group, like inulin. As it is the case with similar substances, such as fructans or inulin, sinistrin acts as an energy storage molecule in plants.

Discovery, history, and manufacture 
Already in 1879 Schmiedeberg managed to isolate this carbohydrate from the bulb of the red squill (Urginea maritima). He named the substance ’sinistrin’, from the Latin word 'sinister' for left, according to its optical rotation activities. Sinistrin was also found in mucines of edible snails (Helix pomatia) by Hammarsten in 1885.
Today sinistrin is industrially manufactured out of the bulb of red squill by various extraction and purification steps.

Biochemistry
Sinistrin is an inulin-type β–D-fructan with branches on position 6. It belongs to the group of fructans and is partly counted among the fructooligosaccharides (FOS). Sinistrin is composed out of fructose units (97%) and glucose units (3%, approximately), building a chain of fructose molecules with a terminal glucose unit. The degree of polymerisation (dp) of sinistrin is in average at 15, the molecular weight is at 3500 Da with a range from 2000 to 6000 Da. The main differences between sinistrin and inulin are the higher alkali-resistance and the better water solubility (even in cold water) of sinistrin compared to inulin.

Uses

Medical
Like inulin the polymer sinistrin is not metabolized in human blood and passes the kidneys unchanged. Both, inulin and sinistrin, are therefore frequently used for the diagnosis of kidney disorders. An important measure of kidney function is the glomerular filtration rate (GFR). GFR is the volume of fluid filtered from the renal (kidney) glomerular capillaries into the Bowman's capsule per time unit. To measure this parameter, a marker substance is injected into the blood stream, and its rate of excretion in urine is compared to the plasma concentration. Such a marker substance needs to be non-toxic, not endogenous in the circulation, neither reabsorbed nor secreted in the kidney, and measurable.
The measurement of the sinistrin-clearance is used to exactly determine the GFR in humans. The assays to determine sinistrin in urine or plasma are identical to that used for inulin. However, sinistrin is often preferred to the alternative, inulin, because it is highly soluble in water and easier to handle. For the application as a renal diagnostic an aqueous solution of sinistrin is approved under the trade name „Inutest“.

Notes

References
 D.P. Mertz und H. Sarre: Polyfructosan-S: Eine neue inulinartige Substanz zur Bestimmung des Glomerulusfiltrates und des physiologisch aktiven extracellulären Flüssigkeitsvolumens beim Menschen. Klin Wochenschrift 1963;41:868-72.

Nephrology
Polysaccharides